Crassispira nigrescens is a species of small predatory sea snail, a marine gastropod mollusk in the family Pseudomelatomidae, .

Description
The length of the blackish, brown shell attains 8.5 mm. The shell contains 8 whorls, showing a beaded sculpture. The outer lip is very thick. The sinus is not very deep. The siphonal canal is very short.

Distribution
This marine species occurs in the West Indies.

References

External links
 Rosenberg G., Moretzsohn F. & García E. F. (2009). Gastropoda (Mollusca) of the Gulf of Mexico, Pp. 579–699 in Felder, D.L. and D.K. Camp (eds.), Gulf of Mexico–Origins, Waters, and Biota. Biodiversity. Texas A&M Press, College Station, Texas
 
 De Jong K.M. & Coomans H.E. (1988) Marine gastropods from Curaçao, Aruba and Bonaire. Leiden: E.J. Brill. 261 pp. 
 

nigrescens
Gastropods described in 1845